A gastrointestinal neuroectodermal tumor is a neuroectodermal tumor that appears in the gastrointestinal system.

References

External links 

Types of cancer
Nervous system neoplasia